The 2021 Dubai Women's Sevens was held as two rugby sevens tournaments on consecutive weekends in late November and early December that year. They were played as the tenth international season of the Dubai Women's Sevens, following the cancellation of the 2020 tournament due to impacts of the COVID-19 pandemic. The tournaments were the opening events of the 2021–22 World Rugby Women's Sevens Series.

Due to ongoing impacts of the pandemic, the first event was played behind closed doors on 26–27 November 2021 with no spectators allowed, but the second event was played in front of full crowds on 3–4 December at The Sevens stadium in Dubai. Two pitches were used in Dubai, which allowed matches in overlapping time slots to be played. As only ten women's teams instead of the usual twelve competed in both tournaments, a format based on two pools with five teams in each was used.

Australia won back-to-back titles in Dubai, defeating Fiji in the final of both tournaments.

Format
The ten teams at each tournament were drawn into two pools of five teams. A round-robin was held for each pool, where each team played the others in their pool once. The best teams from each pool played off in the Cup final for the gold and silver medals, and the second best teams from each pool played off in the third place final for the bronze medal.

For the lower classification matches, the third best teams from the pools played off for fifth, the fourth best played off for seventh, and the last two teams in each pool played off for ninth place.

Teams
The ten national women's teams competing at both tournaments in Dubai were:

 
 
 
 
 
 
 
 
 
 

Core teams eligible to play but not participating at Dubai were:

England, who were represented by Great Britain for the first two tournaments of the 2021–22 Series, before competing again as a separate national union for the remainder of the series.

New Zealand, who did not participate in Dubai due to the challenges of COVID-19 travel logistics.

Dubai: Event I

Pool stage – Event I
The first tournament was held with no crowd in attendance at The Sevens stadium in Dubai on 26–27 November 2021. Australia won the tournament, defeating Fiji by 22–7 in the final.

All times in UAE Standard Time (UTC+4:00). The pools were scheduled as follows:

Key:

Pool A – Event I

Pool B – Event I

Knockout stage – Event I

9th place playoff – Event I

5th–8th place playoff – Event I

Cup playoff – Event I

Placings – Event I

Source: World Rugby

Dubai: Event II

Pool stage – Event II
The second tournament was played with spectators in attendance at The Sevens stadium in Dubai on 3–4 December 2021. Australia won the tournament, defeating Fiji by 15–5 in the final.

All times in UAE Standard Time (UTC+4:00). The pools were scheduled as follows:

Key:

Pool A – Event II

Pool B – Event II

Knockout stage – Event II

9th place playoff

5th–8th place playoff – Event II

Cup playoff – Event II

Placings – Event II

Source: World Rugby

See also
 2021 Dubai Sevens (for men's teams)

References

External links 
 Tournament site
 World Rugby info – Event I
 World Rugby info – Event II

2021
2021–22 World Rugby Women's Sevens Series
2021 in Emirati sport
2021 in Asian rugby union
Dubai Women's Sevens
Dubai Women's Sevens